Lachute is a town in southwest Quebec, Canada,  northwest of Montreal, on the Rivière du Nord, a tributary of the Ottawa River, and west of Mirabel International Airport. It is located on Autoroute 50, at the junctions of Quebec Provincial Highways Route 148, Route 158, and Secondary Highways 327 and 329.

Lachute is the seat of Argenteuil Regional County Municipality, and is served by the Lachute Airport. Its major industries include paper mills and lumber. The population is about 14,000 people.

History
In 1753, Antoine Brunet became the first francophone to settle in Lachute temporarily. In 1796, Jedediah Lane, from Jericho, Vermont, bought several thousand acres of land on both sides of the North River, where Lachute is today. That same year, Hezekiah Clark and his family, also of Jericho, settled near the falls on the North River, followed by Loyalists fleeing the American Revolution. Two years later, the population of the Chute settlement (as it was then known by its English name) consisted of five families.

The village grew quickly; by 1803, 30 families were scattered on both banks of the North River and by 1810, Lachute counted 83 families, including 211 children of school age. In 1804, a mill was built at the falls and the first general store opened in 1813. One year later, Sir John Johnson bought a large part of the Argenteuil Seigneury. He built a sawmill and gave land for the construction of churches, helping to attract new settlers to Argenteuil. In 1825, Thomas Barron became the first judge, then the first mayor of Lachute. The Lachute post office was established in 1835.

From 1870 to 1880, Lachute went through another period of expansion, including economic and social development; the railway linking Montreal and Ottawa was built through the centre of the small town. Industries were established: Félix Hamelin and Thomas Henry Ayers established a wool mill and Irishman James Crocket Wilson opened a paper mill.

In 1885, the Town of Lachute was incorporated with a population  around 1300 persons, and in the same year, Lachute high school was founded. In 1901, electricity was brought to the town.

In 1966, Lachute and the Village of Ayersville merged, forming the Cité de Lachute. In 1971, during the construction of Montréal-Mirabel International Airport, a part of the Saint-Jérusalem Parish was added to Lachute. In 1981, Cité de Lachute became Ville de Lachute. In 2000, about 10 km2 of Mirabel's territory were annexed by Lachute. In 2002, the Service de police municipale de Lachute was transferred to the Sûreté du Québec.

The Expo Lachute Fair is the oldest fair in Quebec and the second-oldest in all of Canada, running from 1825 to the present. In 1917, the Argenteuil Agricultural Society purchased land to hold the Expo Lachute Fair permanently in Lachute.  In 1917, the construction of the grandstand and the track was completed, with new cattle and horse barns being constructed as time and money allowed. The Fall Fair was changed to a Spring Fair in 1925 so that it could be deemed strictly a livestock show. Lachute was not always host to the exhibition; from 1825 to 1826, inhabitants of the county of York met in the then-bustling business centre of St. Andrews, to form a society called the County of York Agricultural Society, later changed to the Two Mountains Agricultural Society, and finally the Argenteuil Agricultural Society. Today, the Expo Lachute Fair is still going strong; an annual agriculture fair is held in July and the Fall Derby is in September. The fairgrounds are also used for several other local events throughout the year.

Demographics 

Climate

Education
The Commission scolaire de la Rivière-du-Nord operates French-language public schools.
 École l'Oasis
 École Saint-Alexandre 
 École Saint-Julien
 École polyvalente Lavigne

Sir Wilfrid Laurier School Board operates English-language public schools:
 Laurentian Elementary School
 Laurentian Regional High School

Notable people
 John Lavis
 Salem Bland,  Methodist theologian and Social Gospel leader.
 Kevin Lowe, former NHL defenceman and current vice-chairman of the Edmonton Oilers.
 Jim Watson, former Member of Provincial Parliament (MPP) for the riding of Ottawa West—Nepean and Minister of Municipal Affairs and Housing; current Mayor of Ottawa, Ontario.  The Hon. Mayor Watson is a member of the Ontario Liberal Party.
 Pierre Pagé, former coach of several NHL hockey teams (Calgary, Minnesota, Quebec and Anaheim), and currently head coach of Eisbären Berlin (Berlin Polar Bears) of the Deutsche Eishockey Liga.
 Thain Wendell MacDowell, Victoria Cross Recipient 1917, Vimy Ridge, France.
 Bob Paulson, Assistant Commissioner of the RCMP; Commander of the National Security Criminal Investigations Unit.

Media
CJLA-FM (Planète Lov 104,9) – an adult contemporary formatted station.

See also 
List of cities in Quebec
 Rev. Henry Flesher Bland

References

External links 

Official web site of the city

 
Cities and towns in Quebec